Evgeni Olegovich Bolyakin (born 20 April 1990) is a Kazakhstani professional ice hockey player who is currently playing with Yermak Angarsk in the Supreme Hockey League (VHL).

Bolyakin played in the Kontinental Hockey League with Amur Khabarovsk during the 2008-09 KHL season and with HC Spartak Moscow during the 2009–10 KHL season.

References

External links 

1990 births
Sportspeople from Karaganda
Amur Khabarovsk players
Beibarys Atyrau players
HC Spartak Moscow players
Kazakhstani ice hockey defencemen
Kazzinc-Torpedo players
Living people
Nomad Astana players
Saryarka Karagandy players
Zauralie Kurgan players
HC Almaty players